The Detroit Film Critics Society is a film critic organization based in Detroit, Michigan, United States. It was founded in 2007, and comprises a group of over twenty film critics. To become a member, the critic must have reviewed at least twelve films a year in an established publication, with no more than two different critics per publication admitted. It presents annual awards at the end of the year, for the best films of the preceding year.

Categories
 Best Film
 Best Director
 Best Actor
 Best Actress
 Best Supporting Actor
 Best Supporting Actress
 Best Ensemble
 Best Screenplay
 Breakthrough Performance
 Best Documentary
 Best Animated Feature
 Best Use of Music

2007

Best Film
No Country for Old Men
 The Diving Bell and the Butterfly
 Juno
 Into the Wild
 There Will Be Blood

Best Director
Joel Coen and Ethan Coen – No Country for Old Men
 Paul Thomas Anderson – There Will Be Blood
 Tim Burton – Sweeney Todd: The Demon Barber of Fleet Street
 Sean Penn – Into the Wild
 Jason Reitman – Juno
 Julian Schnabel – The Diving Bell and the Butterfly

Best Actor
George Clooney – Michael Clayton as Michael Clayton
 Mathieu Amalric – The Diving Bell and the Butterfly as Jean-Dominique Bauby
 Daniel Day-Lewis – There Will Be Blood as Daniel Plainview
 Emile Hirsch – Into the Wild as Christopher McCandless / Alexander Supertramp
 Tommy Lee Jones – No Country for Old Men Sheriff Ed Tom Bell

Best Actress
Elliot Page – Juno as Juno MacGuff
 Amy Adams – Enchanted as Princess Giselle
 Julie Christie – Away from Her as Fiona Anderson
 Marion Cotillard – La Vie en rose as Édith Piaf
 Laura Linney – The Savages as Wendy Savage

Best Supporting Actor
Javier Bardem – No Country for Old Men as Anton Chigurh
 Casey Affleck – The Assassination of Jesse James by the Coward Robert Ford as Robert Ford
 Paul Dano – There Will Be Blood as Paul Sunday / Eli Sunday
 Hal Holbrook – Into the Wild as Ron Franz
 Tom Wilkinson – Michael Clayton as Arthur Edens

Best Supporting Actress
Tilda Swinton – Michael Clayton as Karen Crowder
 Cate Blanchett – I'm Not There as Jude Quinn
 Catherine Keener – Into the Wild as Jan Burres
 Emily Mortimer – Lars and the Real Girl as Karin
 Amy Ryan – Gone Baby Gone as Helene McCready

Best Cast
Juno
 Before the Devil Knows You're Dead
 Lars and the Real Girl
 Waitress
 Zodiac

Best Newcomer
Diablo Cody – Juno
 Nikki Blonsky – Hairspray
 Michael Cera – Juno and Superbad
 Sarah Polley – Away from Her
 Adrienne Shelly – Waitress

2008

Best Film
Slumdog Millionaire
 The Dark Knight
 Frost/Nixon
 WALL-E
 The Wrestler

Best Director
Danny Boyle – Slumdog Millionaire
 Darren Aronofsky – The Wrestler
 Ron Howard – Frost/Nixon
 Christopher Nolan – The Dark Knight
 Andrew Stanton – WALL-E

Best Actor
Mickey Rourke – The Wrestler as Randy "The Ram" Robinson
 Josh Brolin – W. as George W. Bush
 Leonardo DiCaprio – Revolutionary Road as Frank Wheeler
 Frank Langella – Frost/Nixon as Richard Nixon
 Sean Penn – Milk as Harvey Milk

Best Actress
Kate Winslet – Revolutionary Road as April Wheeler
 Anne Hathaway – Rachel Getting Married as Kym Buchman
 Sally Hawkins – Happy-Go-Lucky as Pauline "Poppy" Cross
 Melissa Leo – Frozen River as Ray Eddy
 Meryl Streep – Doubt as Sister Aloysius Beauvier

Best Supporting Actor
Heath Ledger – The Dark Knight as The Joker
 Robert Downey Jr. – Tropic Thunder as Kirk Lazarus
 James Franco – Pineapple Express as Saul Silver
 Eddie Marsan – Happy-Go-Lucky as Scott
 Michael Shannon – Revolutionary Road as John Givings, Jr.

Best Supporting Actress
Marisa Tomei – The Wrestler as Pam / Cassidy
 Amy Adams – Doubt as Sister James
 Elizabeth Banks – W. as Laura Bush
 Penélope Cruz – Vicky Cristina Barcelona as María Elena
 Rosemarie DeWitt – Rachel Getting Married as Rachel Buchman

Best Cast
Frost/Nixon
 Burn After Reading
 Rachel Getting Married
 Revolutionary Road
 Tropic Thunder

Best Newcomer
Martin McDonagh – In Bruges
 Rosemarie DeWitt – Rachel Getting Married as Rachel Buchman
 Rebecca Hall – Frost/Nixon and Vicky Cristina Barcelona as Caroline Cushing and Vicky
 Danny McBride – Pineapple Express as Red
 Dev Patel – Slumdog Millionaire as Jamal Malik
 Catinca Untaru – The Fall as Alexandria

2009

Best Film
Up
 (500) Days of Summer
 The Hurt Locker
 Inglourious Basterds
 Up in the Air

Best Director
Pete Docter – Up
 Kathryn Bigelow – The Hurt Locker
 Jason Reitman – Up in the Air
 Quentin Tarantino – Inglourious Basterds
 Marc Webb – (500) Days of Summer

Best Actor
Colin Firth – A Single Man George Falconer
 George Clooney – Up in the Air as Ryan Bingham
 Matt Damon – The Informant! as Mark Whitacre
 Joseph Gordon-Levitt – (500) Days of Summer as Tom Hansen
 Sam Rockwell – Moon as Sam Bell

Best Actress
Gabourey Sidibe – Precious as Claireece "Precious" Jones
 Alison Lohman – Drag Me to Hell as Christine Brown
 Carey Mulligan – An Education as Jenny Melor
 Saoirse Ronan – The Lovely Bones as Susie Salmon
 Meryl Streep – Julie & Julia as Julia Child

Best Supporting Actor
Christoph Waltz – Inglourious Basterds as Col. Hans Landa
 Woody Harrelson – The Messenger as Capt. Tony Stone
 Woody Harrelson – Zombieland as Tallahassee
 Christian McKay – Me and Orson Welles as Orson Welles
 Stanley Tucci – The Lovely Bones as George Harvey

Best Supporting Actress
Mo'Nique – Precious as Mary Lee Johnston
 Marion Cotillard – Nine as Luisa Contini
 Vera Farmiga – Up in the Air as Alex Goran
 Anna Kendrick – Up in the Air as Natalie Keener
 Mélanie Laurent – Inglourious Basterds as Shosanna Dreyfuss

Best Ensemble
The Hangover
 Inglourious Basterds
 Precious
 Star Trek
 Zombieland

Breakthrough Performance
Gabourey Sidibe – Precious as Claireece "Precious" Jones
 Anna Kendrick – Up in the Air as Natalie Keener
 Christian McKay – Me and Orson Welles as Orson Welles
 Carey Mulligan – An Education as Jenny Mellor
 Chris Pine – Star Trek as James T. Kirk
 Christoph Waltz – Inglourious Basterds as Col. Hans Landa

2010

Best Film
 The Social Network
 127 Hours
 Inception
 The King's Speech
 Winter's Bone

Best Director
Danny Boyle – 127 Hours
 David Fincher – The Social Network
 Debra Granik – Winter's Bone
 Tom Hooper – The King's Speech
 Christopher Nolan – Inception
 Edgar Wright – Scott Pilgrim vs. the World

Best Actor
Colin Firth – The King's Speech as George VI
 Jeff Bridges – True Grit as Reuben "Rooster" Cogburn
 Jesse Eisenberg – The Social Network as Mark Zuckerberg
 James Franco – 127 Hours as Aron Ralston
 Ryan Gosling – Blue Valentine as Dean Pereira

Best Actress
Jennifer Lawrence – Winter's Bone as Ree Dolly
 Nicole Kidman – Rabbit Hole as Becca Corbett
 Carey Mulligan – Never Let Me Go as Kathy H
 Natalie Portman – Black Swan as Nina Sayers
 Michelle Williams – Blue Valentine as Cynthia "Cindy" Heller

Best Supporting Actor
Christian Bale – The Fighter as Dickie Eklund
 Andrew Garfield – The Social Network as Eduardo Saverin
 John Hawkes – Winter's Bone as Teardop Dolly
 Sam Rockwell – Conviction as Kenny Waters
 Mark Ruffalo – The Kids Are All Right as Paul Hatfield
 Geoffrey Rush – The King's Speech as Lionel Logue

Best Supporting Actress
Amy Adams – The Fighter as Charlene Fleming
 Helena Bonham Carter – The King's Speech as Queen Elizabeth
 Greta Gerwig – Greenberg as Florence Marr
 Melissa Leo – The Fighter as Alice Eklund
 Jacki Weaver – Animal Kingdom as Janine "Smurf" Cody

Best Ensemble
Winter's Bone
 The Fighter
 The Kids Are All Right
 The King's Speech
 Scott Pilgrim vs. the World

Breakthrough Performance
Jennifer Lawrence – Winter's Bone as Ree Dolly
 Andrew Garfield – The Social Network and Never Let Me Go as Eduardo Saverin and Tommy
 Greta Gerwig – Greenberg as Florence Marr
 Chloë Grace Moretz – Kick-Ass and Let Me In as Hit-Girl and Abby
 Mia Wasikowska – The Kids Are All Right as Joni Allgood

2011

Best Film
The Artist
 The Descendants
 Hugo
 Take Shelter
 The Tree of Life

Best Director
Michel Hazanavicius – The Artist
 Terrence Malick – The Tree of Life
 Jeff Nichols – Take Shelter
 Martin Scorsese – Hugo
 Nicolas Winding Refn – Drive

Best Actor
Michael Fassbender – Shame as Brandon Sullivan
 George Clooney – The Descendants as Matt King
 Jean Dujardin – The Artist as George Valentin
 Brad Pitt – Moneyball as Billy Beane
 Michael Shannon – Take Shelter as Curtis LaForche

Best Actress
Michelle Williams – My Week with Marilyn as Marilyn Monroe
 Viola Davis – The Help as Aibileen Clark
 Felicity Jones – Like Crazy as Anna Maria Gardner
 Meryl Streep – The Iron Lady as Margaret Thatcher
 Charlize Theron – Young Adult as Mavis Gary

Best Supporting Actor
Christopher Plummer – Beginners as Hal Fields
 Kenneth Branagh – My Week with Marilyn as Laurence Olivier
 Albert Brooks – Drive as Bernie Rose
 Ryan Gosling – Crazy, Stupid, Love as Jacob Palmer
 Patton Oswalt – Young Adult as Matt Freehauf

Best Supporting Actress
Carey Mulligan – Shame as Sissy Sullivan
 Bérénice Bejo – The Artist as Peppy Miller
 Jessica Chastain – Take Shelter as Samantha LaForche
 Vanessa Redgrave – Coriolanus as Volumnia
 Octavia Spencer – The Help as Minny Jackson

Best Ensemble
Carnage
 Cedar Rapids
 Crazy, Stupid, Love
 The Help
 Margin Call
 Win Win

Breakthrough Performance
Jessica Chastain – The Help, Take Shelter and The Tree of Life as Celia Foote, Samantha LaForche, and Mrs. O’Brien
 Felicity Jones – Like Crazy as Anna Maria Gardner
 Melissa McCarthy – Bridesmaids as Megan Price
 Elizabeth Olsen – Martha Marcy May Marlene as Martha
 Shailene Woodley – The Descendants as Alexandra King

Best Screenplay
Moneyball – Steven Zaillian and Aaron Sorkin 50/50 – Will Reiser
 The Artist – Michel Hazanavicius
 Beginners – Mike Mills
 Take Shelter – Jeff Nichols

Best Documentary FilmTabloid
 Into Eternity
 Into the Abyss
 Marwencol
 We Were Here

2012

Best Film
Silver Linings Playbook
 Argo
 The Impossible
 Take This Waltz
 Zero Dark Thirty

Best Director
David O. Russell – Silver Linings Playbook
 Ben Affleck – Argo
 J. A. Bayona – The Impossible
 Kathryn Bigelow – Zero Dark Thirty
 Sarah Polley – Take This Waltz

Best Actor
Daniel Day-Lewis – Lincoln as Abraham Lincoln
 Bradley Cooper – Silver Linings Playbook as Patrick "Pat" Solatano, Jr.
 John Hawkes – The Sessions as Mark O'Brien
 Bill Murray – Hyde Park on Hudson as Franklin D. Roosevelt
 Joaquin Phoenix – The Master as Freddie Quell

Best Actress
Jennifer Lawrence – Silver Linings Playbook as Tiffany Maxwell
 Jessica Chastain – Zero Dark Thirty as Maya
 Greta Gerwig – Damsels in Distress as Violet
 Naomi Watts – The Impossible as Maria Bennett
 Michelle Williams – Take This Waltz as Margot

Best Supporting Actor
Robert De Niro – Silver Linings Playbook as Patrizio "Pat" Solitano, Sr.
 Philip Seymour Hoffman – The Master as Lancaster Dodd
 Tommy Lee Jones – Lincoln as Thaddeus Stevens
 Matthew McConaughey – Magic Mike as Dallas
 Ewan McGregor – The Impossible as Henry Bennett
 Ezra Miller – The Perks of Being a Wallflower as Patrick

Best Supporting Actress
Anne Hathaway – Les Misérables as Fantine
 Amy Adams – The Master as Peggy Dodd
 Ann Dowd – Compliance as Sandra
 Sally Field – Lincoln as Mary Todd Lincoln
 Helen Hunt – The Sessions as Cheryl Cohen-Greene

Best Ensemble
Lincoln
 Argo
 The Avengers
 Moonrise Kingdom
 Silver Linings Playbook

Breakthrough Performance
Zoe Kazan – Ruby Sparks
 Stephen Chbosky – The Perks of Being a Wallflower
 Rebel Wilson – Pitch Perfect
 Benh Zeitlin – Beasts of the Southern Wild
 Craig Zobel – Compliance

Best Screenplay
Silver Linings Playbook – David O. Russell The Cabin in the Woods – Joss Whedon and Drew Goddard
 Lincoln – Tony Kushner
 The Perks of Being a Wallflower – Stephen Chbosky
 Take This Waltz – Sarah Polley

Best Documentary FilmJiro Dreams of Sushi
 The House I Live In
 The Imposter
 The Queen of Versailles
 Searching for Sugar Man

2013

Best Film
Her
 12 Years a Slave
 Before Midnight
 Gravity
 Short Term 12

Best Director
Alfonso Cuarón – Gravity
 Paul Greengrass – Captain Phillips
 Spike Jonze – Her
 David O. Russell – American Hustle
 Martin Scorsese – The Wolf of Wall Street

Best Actor
Matthew McConaughey – Dallas Buyers Club as Ron Woodroof
 Leonardo DiCaprio – The Wolf of Wall Street as Jordan Belfort
 Chiwetel Ejiofor – 12 Years a Slave as Solomon Northup
 Tom Hanks – Captain Phillips as Captain Richard Phillips
 Robert Redford – All Is Lost as Our Man

Best Actress
Brie Larson – Short Term 12 as Grace
 Amy Adams – American Hustle as Sydney Prosser / Lady Edith Greensly (based on Evelyn Knight)
 Julie Delpy – Before Midnight as Céline
 Adèle Exarchopoulos – Blue Is the Warmest Colour as Adèle
 Meryl Streep – August: Osage County as Violet Weston

Best Supporting Actor
Jared Leto – Dallas Buyers Club as Rayon
 Barkhad Abdi – Captain Phillips as Abduwali Muse
 James Franco – Spring Breakers as Alien
 Matthew McConaughey – Mud as Mud
 Stanley Tucci – The Hunger Games: Catching Fire as Caesar Flickerman

Best Supporting Actress
Scarlett Johansson – Her as Samantha (voice)
 Jennifer Lawrence – American Hustle as Rosalyn Rosenfeld (based on Cynthia Marie Weinberg)
 Lupita Nyong'o – 12 Years a Slave as Patsey
 Julia Roberts – August: Osage County as Barbara Weston-Fordham
 June Squibb – Nebraska as Kate Grant

Best Ensemble
American Hustle
 12 Years a Slave
 August: Osage County
 Blue Jasmine
 The Wolf of Wall Street

Breakthrough Performance
Brie Larson – Short Term 12 (actress)
 Lake Bell – In a World (actress, screenplay, director)
 Ryan Coogler – Fruitvale Station (screenplay, director)
 Destin Cretton – Short Term 12 (screenplay, director)
 Michael B. Jordan – Fruitvale Station (actor)

Best Screenplay
Spike Jonze – Her
 Destin Cretton – Short Term 12
 Richard Linklater, Julie Delpy, and Ethan Hawke – Before Midnight
 David O. Russell and Eric Warren Singer – American Hustle
 Terence Winter – The Wolf of Wall Street

Best Documentary Film
Stories We Tell
 Blackfish
 The Act of Killing
 The Square
 The Unknown Known

2014

Best Film
Boyhood
 Birdman
 The Grand Budapest Hotel
 Under the Skin
 Whiplash

Best Director
Richard Linklater – Boyhood
 Wes Anderson – The Grand Budapest Hotel
 Damien Chazelle – Whiplash
 Jonathan Glazer – Under the Skin
 Alejandro G. Iñárritu – Birdman

Best Actor
Michael Keaton – Birdman as Riggan Thomson
 Benedict Cumberbatch – The Imitation Game as Alan Turing
 Brendan Gleeson – Calvary as Father James
 Jake Gyllenhaal – Nightcrawler as Louis "Lou" Bloom
 Tom Hardy – Locke as Ivan Locke
 Eddie Redmayne – The Theory of Everything as Stephen Hawking

Best Actress
Rosamund Pike – Gone Girl as Amy Elliott-Dunne
 Essie Davis – The Babadook as Amelia
 Scarlett Johansson – Under the Skin as The Female
 Julianne Moore – Still Alice as Dr. Alice Howland
 Reese Witherspoon – Wild as Cheryl Strayed

Best Supporting Actor
J. K. Simmons – Whiplash as Terence Fletcher
 Josh Brolin – Inherent Vice as Lt. Det. Christian "Bigfoot" Bjornsen
 Ethan Hawke – Boyhood as Mason Evans, Sr.
 Edward Norton – Birdman as Mike Shiner
 Mark Ruffalo – Foxcatcher as Dave Schultz

Best Supporting Actress
Patricia Arquette – Boyhood as Olivia Evans
 Laura Dern – Wild as Barbara "Bobbi" Grey
 Rene Russo – Nightcrawler as Nina Romina
 Emma Stone – Birdman as Sam Thomson
 Tilda Swinton – Snowpiercer as Deputy-Minister Mason

Best Ensemble
Birdman or (The Unexpected Virtue of Ignorance) (TIE) The Grand Budapest Hotel (TIE) Guardians of the Galaxy (TIE) Boyhood
 Into the Woods

Breakthrough PerformanceDamien Chazelle – Whiplash (director, screenplay)
 Jennifer Kent – The Babadook (director, screenplay)
 Gugu Mbatha-Raw – Belle, Beyond the Lights (actress)
 Chris Pratt – Guardians of the Galaxy (actor)
 Dan Stevens – The Guest (actor)

Best Screenplay
Richard Linklater – Boyhood
 Wes Anderson – The Grand Budapest Hotel
 Damien Chazelle – Whiplash
 Alejandro G. Iñárritu, Nicolás Giacobone, Alexander Dinelaris Jr., and Armando Bó – Birdman
 John Michael McDonagh – Calvary

Best Documentary
Citizenfour
 Finding Vivian Maier
 Jodorowsky’s Dune
 Keep On Keepin’ On
 Life Itself

2015

Best Film
Spotlight
 Brooklyn
 Inside Out
 Mad Max: Fury Road
 The Revenant
 Sicario
 Youth

Best Director
George Miller – Mad Max: Fury Road
 John Crowley – Brooklyn
 Alejandro G. Iñárritu – The Revenant
 Tom McCarthy – Spotlight
 Paolo Sorrentino – Youth

Best Actor
Michael Caine – Youth as Fred Ballinger
 Christopher Abbott – James White as James White
 Leonardo DiCaprio – The Revenant as Hugh Glass
 Michael Fassbender – Steve Jobs as Steve Jobs
 Tom Hardy – Legend as Ronnie and Reggie Kray

Best Actress
 Saoirse Ronan – Brooklyn as Eilis Lacey
 Cate Blanchett – Carol as Carol Aird
 Brie Larson – Room as Joy 'Ma' Newsome
 Jennifer Lawrence – Joy as Joy Mangano
 Bel Powley – The Diary of a Teenage Girl as Minnie Goetze

Best Supporting Actor
Liev Schreiber – Spotlight as Martin Baron
 Paul Dano – Love & Mercy as Brian Wilson
 Benicio del Toro – Sicario as Alejandro Gillick
 Oscar Isaac – Ex Machina as Nathan Bateman
 Jacob Tremblay – Room as Jack Newsome

Best Supporting Actress
Alicia Vikander – The Danish Girl as Gerda Wegener
 Jennifer Jason Leigh – The Hateful Eight as Daisy Domergue
 Cynthia Nixon – James White as Gail White
 Kristen Stewart – Clouds of Sils Maria as Valentine
 Alicia Vikander – Ex Machina as Ava

Best Ensemble
Spotlight
 The Big Short
 The Hateful Eight
 Inside Out
 Joy

Breakthrough Performance
Alicia Vikander – The Danish Girl and Ex Machina
 Sean Baker – Tangerine (director, screenplay)
 Emory Cohen – Brooklyn (actor)
 Bel Powley – The Diary of a Teenage Girl (actress)
 Jacob Tremblay – Room (actor)

Best Screenplay
Tom McCarthy and Josh Singer – Spotlight
 Pete Docter, Meg LeFauve, and Josh Cooley – Inside Out
 Nick Hornby – Brooklyn
 Adam McKay and Charles Randolph – The Big Short
 Quentin Tarantino – The Hateful Eight

Best Documentary
Amy
 Best of Enemies
 Going Clear: Scientology and the Prison of Belief
 Listen to Me Marlon
 The Look of Silence

2016

Best Film
La La Land
 The Edge of Seventeen
 Hell or High Water
 Manchester by the Sea
 Moonlight

Best Director
Damien Chazelle – La La Land
 Barry Jenkins – Moonlight
 Kenneth Lonergan – Manchester by the Sea
 David Mackenzie – Hell or High Water
 Denzel Washington – Fences

Best Actor
Casey Affleck – Manchester by the Sea as Lee Chandler
 Joel Edgerton – Loving as Richard Loving
 Andrew Garfield – Hacksaw Ridge as Desmond T. Doss
 Ryan Gosling – La La Land as Sebastian Wilder
 Denzel Washington – Fences as Troy Maxson

Best Actress
Emma Stone – La La Land as Mia Dolan
 Amy Adams – Arrival as Dr. Louise Banks
 Annette Bening – 20th Century Women as Dorothea Fields
 Rebecca Hall – Christine as Christine Chubbuck
 Ruth Negga – Loving as Mildred Loving
 Natalie Portman – Jackie as Jacqueline Kennedy

Best Supporting Actor
Jeff Bridges – Hell or High Water as Marcus Hamilton
 Mahershala Ali – Moonlight as Juan
 Alden Ehrenreich – Hail, Caesar! as Hobie Doyle
 Ralph Fiennes – A Bigger Splash as Harry Hawkes
 Lucas Hedges – Manchester by the Sea as Patrick Chandler

Best Supporting Actress
Viola Davis – Fences as Rose Maxson (TIE) 
Greta Gerwig – 20th Century Women as Abbie (TIE)
 Elle Fanning – 20th Century Women as Julie
 Felicity Jones – A Monster Calls as Lizzie O'Malley
 Michelle Williams – Manchester by the Sea as Randi Chandler

Best Ensemble
20th Century Women
 Everybody Wants Some!!
 Hell or High Water
 Manchester by the Sea
 Moonlight

Breakthrough Performance
Kelly Fremon Craig – The Edge of Seventeen (director, screenplay)
 Mahershala Ali – Moonlight, Hidden Figures (actor)
 Lucas Hedges – Manchester by the Sea (actor)
 Barry Jenkins – Moonlight (director, screenplay)
 Trevante Rhodes – Moonlight (actor)
 Trey Edward Shults – Krisha (director, screenplay)

Best Screenplay
Damien Chazelle – La La Land
 Eric Heisserer – Arrival
 Barry Jenkins – Moonlight
 Kenneth Lonergan – Manchester by the Sea
 Taylor Sheridan – Hell or High Water

Best Documentary
O.J.: Made in America
 13th
 Gleason
 Life, Animated
 Tickled
 Weiner

2017

Best Film
The Florida Project
 The Disaster Artist
 Get Out
 The Shape of Water
 Three Billboards Outside Ebbing, Missouri

Best Director
Sean Baker – The Florida Project
 Paul Thomas Anderson – Phantom Thread
 Guillermo del Toro – The Shape of Water
 Greta Gerwig – Lady Bird
 Christopher Nolan – Dunkirk
 Jordan Peele – Get Out

Best Actor
James Franco – The Disaster Artist as Tommy Wiseau
 Timothée Chalamet – Call Me by Your Name as Elio Perlman
 Daniel Day-Lewis – Phantom Thread as Reynolds Woodcock
 Gary Oldman – Darkest Hour as Winston Churchill
 Robert Pattinson – Good Time as Constantine "Connie" Nikas

Best Actress
Frances McDormand – Three Billboards Outside Ebbing, Missouri as Mildred Hayes
 Jessica Chastain – Molly's Game as Molly Bloom
 Sally Hawkins – The Shape of Water as Elisa Esposito
 Margot Robbie – I, Tonya as Tonya Harding
 Saoirse Ronan – Lady Bird as Christine "Lady Bird" McPherson

Best Supporting Actor
Willem Dafoe – The Florida Project as Bobby Hicks
 Richard Jenkins – The Shape of Water as Giles
 Sam Rockwell – Three Billboards Outside Ebbing, Missouri as Jason Dixon
 Patrick Stewart – Logan as Charles Xavier
 Michael Stuhlbarg – Call Me by Your Name as Mr. Perlman

Best Supporting Actress
Allison Janney – I, Tonya as LaVona Golden
 Tiffany Haddish – Girls Trip as Dina
 Holly Hunter – The Big Sick as Beth Gardner
 Melissa Leo – Novitiate as Rev. Mother Marie St. Clair
 Laurie Metcalf – Lady Bird as Marion McPherson

Best Ensemble
The Post
 The Big Sick
 Lady Bird
 Mudbound
 Three Billboards Outside Ebbing, Missouri

Breakthrough Performance
Jordan Peele – Get Out (writer, director)
 Timothée Chalamet – Call Me by Your Name (actor)
 Gal Gadot – Wonder Woman (actress)
 Tiffany Haddish – Girls Trip (actress)
 Caleb Landry Jones – American Made, The Florida Project, Get Out, Three Billboards Outside Ebbing, Missouri (actor)

Best Screenplay
Martin McDonagh – Three Billboards Outside Ebbing, Missouri
 Guillermo del Toro and Vanessa Taylor – The Shape of Water
 Greta Gerwig – Lady Bird
 Emily V. Gordon and Kumail Nanjiani – The Big Sick
 Liz Hannah and Josh Singer – The Post
 Jordan Peele – Get Out
 Taylor Sheridan – Wind River

Best Documentary
Jim & Andy: The Great Beyond
 The Defiant Ones
 Human Flow
 Kedi
 Step
 Strong Island
 Whose Streets?

Best Animated Film
The Lego Batman Movie
 Captain Underpants: The First Epic Movie
 Cars 3
 Coco
 Loving Vincent

Best Use of Music
Baby Driver
 Blade Runner 2049
 Good Time
 Phantom Thread
 The Shape of Water

2018

Best Film
Eighth Grade
 First Reformed
 Green Book
 A Quiet Place
 Roma

Best Director
Adam McKay – Vice
 Bo Burnham – Eighth Grade
 Bradley Cooper – A Star Is Born
 Alfonso Cuarón – Roma
 Paul Schrader – First Reformed

Best Actor
Ethan Hawke – First Reformed as Reverend Ernst Toller
 Christian Bale – Vice as Dick Cheney
 Bradley Cooper – A Star Is Born as Jackson Maine
 Rami Malek – Bohemian Rhapsody as Freddie Mercury
 John David Washington – BlacKkKlansman as Detective Ron Stallworth

Best Actress
Toni Collette – Hereditary as Annie Graham
 Olivia Colman – The Favourite as Queen Anne
 Elsie Fisher – Eighth Grade as Kayla Day
 Lady Gaga – A Star Is Born as Ally Maine
 Melissa McCarthy – Can You Ever Forgive Me? as Lee Israel

Best Supporting Actor
Josh Hamilton – Eighth Grade as Mark Day
 Mahershala Ali – Green Book as Don Shirley
 Sam Elliott – A Star Is Born as Bobby Maine
 Richard E. Grant – Can You Ever Forgive Me? as Jack Hock
 Jesse Plemons – Game Night as Gary Kingsbury

Best Supporting Actress
Regina King – If Beale Street Could Talk as Sharon Rivers
 Amy Adams – Vice as Lynne Cheney
 Thomasin McKenzie – Leave No Trace as Tom
 Emma Stone — The Favourite as Abigail Hill
 Rachel Weisz – The Favourite as Sarah Churchill

Best Ensemble
Vice
 Crazy Rich Asians
 Eighth Grade
 The Favourite
 Roma

Breakthrough Performance
Bo Burnham – Eighth Grade (writer/director)
 Rafael Casal and Daveed Diggs – Blindspotting (writers/actors)
 Elsie Fisher – Eighth Grade (actress)
 Lady Gaga – A Star Is Born (actress)
 Boots Riley – Sorry to Bother You (writer/director)

Best Screenplay
Brian Hayes Currie, Peter Farrelly, and Nick Vallelonga – Green Book (TIE) 
Adam McKay – Vice (TIE)
 Bo Burnham – Eighth Grade
 Deborah Davis and Tony McNamara – The Favourite
 Paul Schrader – First Reformed

Best Documentary
Three Identical Strangers
 Free Solo
 RBG
 Whitney
 Won't You Be My Neighbor?

Best Animated Film
Spider-Man: Into the Spider-Verse
 Incredibles 2
 Isle of Dogs
 Ralph Breaks the Internet
 Smallfoot

Best Use of Music
A Star Is Born
 Bohemian Rhapsody
 Green Book
 Mandy
 Mary Poppins Returns

2019

Best Film
Parasite
 The Irishman
 Jojo Rabbit
 Marriage Story
 Once Upon a Time in Hollywood

Best Director
Martin Scorsese – The Irishman
 Noah Baumbach – Marriage Story
 Bong Joon-ho – Parasite
 Quentin Tarantino – Once Upon a Time in Hollywood
 Taika Waititi – Jojo Rabbit

Best Actor
Adam Driver – Marriage Story as Charlie Barber
 Robert De Niro – The Irishman as Frank "The Irishman" Sheeran
 Robert Pattinson – The Lighthouse as Ephraim Winslow
 Joaquin Phoenix – Joker as Arthur Fleck / Joker
 Adam Sandler – Uncut Gems as Howard Ratner

Best Actress
Scarlett Johansson – Marriage Story as Nicole Barber
 Julianne Moore – Gloria Bell as Gloria Bell
 Lupita Nyong'o – Us as Adelaide Wilson / Red
 Charlize Theron – Bombshell as Megyn Kelly
 Renée Zellweger – Judy as Judy Garland

Best Supporting Actor
Joe Pesci – The Irishman as Russell Bufalino
 Willem Dafoe – The Lighthouse as Thomas Wake
 Tom Hanks – A Beautiful Day in the Neighborhood as Fred Rogers
 Brad Pitt – Once Upon a Time in Hollywood as Cliff Booth
 Sam Rockwell – Richard Jewell as Watson Bryant
 Wesley Snipes – Dolemite Is My Name as D'Urville Martin

Best Supporting Actress
Laura Dern – Marriage Story as Nora Fanshaw
 Kathy Bates – Richard Jewell as Barbara "Bobi" Jewell
 Scarlett Johansson – Jojo Rabbit as Rosie Betzler
 Anna Paquin – The Irishman as Peggy Sheeran
 Florence Pugh – Little Women as Amy March

Best Ensemble
Once Upon a Time in Hollywood
 Dolemite Is My Name
 The Farewell
 The Irishman
 Parasite

Breakthrough Performance
Florence Pugh – Fighting with My Family, Midsommar, Little Women (actress)
 Ana de Armas – Knives Out, The Informer, Yesterday (actress)
 Jessie Buckley – Wild Rose, Judy (actress)
 Kaitlyn Dever – Booksmart, Them That Follow (actress)
 Aisling Franciosi – The Nightingale (actress)
 Paul Walter Hauser – Richard Jewell, Late Night, Beats (actor)
 Lulu Wang – The Farewell (writer/director/producer)
 Olivia Wilde – Booksmart (director)

Best Screenplay
Noah Baumbach – Marriage Story
 Bong Joon-ho and Han Jin-won – Parasite
 Robert Eggers and Max Eggers – The Lighthouse
 Quentin Tarantino – Once Upon a Time in Hollywood
 Steven Zaillian – The Irishman

Best Documentary
Apollo 11
 Amazing Grace
 Horror Noire: A History of Black Horror
 Knock Down the House
 Rolling Thunder Revue: A Bob Dylan Story by Martin Scorsese

Best Animated Film
Toy Story 4
 Frozen II
 How to Train Your Dragon: The Hidden World
 I Lost My Body
 Klaus

Best Use of Music
Once Upon a Time in Hollywood
 1917
 Rocketman
 Uncut Gems
 Wild Rose

2020

Best Film
Nomadland
 First Cow
 Minari
 Sound of Metal
 The Trial of the Chicago 7

Best Director
Chloé Zhao – Nomadland
 Lee Isaac Chung – Minari
 Regina King – One Night in Miami...
 Spike Lee – Da 5 Bloods
 Aaron Sorkin – The Trial of the Chicago 7

Best Actor
Delroy Lindo – Da 5 Bloods as Paul
 Riz Ahmed – Sound of Metal as Ruben Stone
 Chadwick Boseman – Ma Rainey's Black Bottom as Levee Green
 Anthony Hopkins – The Father as Anthony
 Steven Yeun – Minari as Jacob Yi

Best Actress
Frances McDormand – Nomadland as Fern
 Jessie Buckley – I'm Thinking of Ending Things as Young Woman
 Viola Davis – Ma Rainey's Black Bottom as Ma Rainey
 Vanessa Kirby – Pieces of a Woman as Martha Weiss
 Carey Mulligan – Promising Young Woman as Cassandra "Cassie" Thomas

Best Supporting Actor
Daniel Kaluuya – Judas and the Black Messiah as Fred Hampton
 Christopher Abbott – Possessor as Colin Tate
 Sacha Baron Cohen – The Trial of the Chicago 7 as Abbie Hoffman
 Leslie Odom Jr. – One Night in Miami... as Sam Cooke
 Paul Raci – Sound of Metal as Joe

Best Supporting Actress
Yuh-Jung Youn – Minari as Soon-ja
 Maria Bakalova – Borat Subsequent Moviefilm as Tutar Sagdiyev
 Ellen Burstyn – Pieces of a Woman as Elizabeth Weiss
 Glenn Close – Hillbilly Elegy as Bonnie "Mamaw" Vance
 Olivia Colman – The Father as Anne

Best Ensemble
Minari
 Da 5 Bloods
 Ma Rainey's Black Bottom
 One Night in Miami...
 The Trial of the Chicago 7

Breakthrough Performance
Maria Bakalova – Borat Subsequent Moviefilm (actress)
 Jasmine Batchelor – The Surrogate (actress)
 Radha Blank – The 40-Year-Old Version (actress/writer/director/producer)
 Orion Lee – First Cow (actor)
 Wunmi Mosaku – His House (actress)

Best Adapted Screenplay
Chloé Zhao – Nomadland
 Charlie Kaufman – I’m Thinking of Ending Things
 Kemp Powers – One Night in Miami...
 Kelly Reichardt and Jonathan Raymond – First Cow
 Ruben Santiago-Hudson – Ma Rainey's Black Bottom

Best Original Screenplay
Lee Isaac Chung – Minari
 Emerald Fennell – Promising Young Woman
 Shaka King and Will Berson – Judas and the Black Messiah
 Darius Marder and Abraham Marder – Sound of Metal
 Aaron Sorkin – The Trial of the Chicago 7

Best Documentary
Dick Johnson Is Dead
 All In: The Fight for Democracy
 Boys State
 The Dissident
 Time

Best Animated Film
Soul
 The Croods: A New Age
 Onward
 Over the Moon
 Wolfwalkers

Best Use of Music
Sound of Metal
 News of the World
 Possessor
 Soul
 Tenet

2021

Best Film
Cyrano
 Belfast
 CODA
 Don't Look Up
 King Richard

Best Director
Lin-Manuel Miranda – tick, tick... BOOM!
 Sean Baker – Red Rocket
 Kenneth Branagh – Belfast
 David Lowery – The Green Knight
 Adam McKay – Don't Look Up

Best Actor
Peter Dinklage – Cyrano as Cyrano de Bergerac
 Nicolas Cage – Pig as Robin "Rob" Feld
 Andrew Garfield – tick, tick... BOOM! as Jonathan Larson
 Oscar Isaac – The Card Counter as William Tell
 Will Smith – King Richard as Richard Williams

Best Actress
Jessica Chastain – The Eyes of Tammy Faye as Tammy Faye Bakker
 Alana Haim – Licorice Pizza as Alana Kane
 Jennifer Hudson – Respect as Aretha Franklin
 Nicole Kidman – Being the Ricardos as Lucille Ball
 Kristen Stewart – Spencer as Princess Diana

Best Supporting Actor
Jon Bernthal – King Richard as Rick Macci
 Troy Kotsur – CODA as Frank Rossi
 Jared Leto – House of Gucci as Paolo Gucci
 Ray Liotta – The Many Saints of Newark as Aldo "Hollywood Dick" Moltisanti / Salvatore "Sally" Moltisanti
 Kodi Smit-McPhee – The Power of the Dog as Peter Gordon

Best Supporting Actress
Ariana DeBose – West Side Story as Anita
 Kirsten Dunst – The Power of the Dog as Rose Gordon
 Aunjanue Ellis – King Richard as Oracene "Brandy" Price
 Rita Moreno – West Side Story as Valentina
 Diana Rigg – Last Night in Soho as Ms. Collins

Best Ensemble
The French Dispatch
 CODA
 Don't Look Up
 The Harder They Fall
 House of Gucci

Breakthrough Performance
Woody Norman – C'mon C'mon (actor) (TIE) 
Emma Seligman – Shiva Baby (writer/director) (TIE)
 Alana Haim – Licorice Pizza (actress)
 Emilia Jones – CODA (actress)
 Agathe Rousselle – Titane (actress)

Best Adapted Screenplay
Jane Campion – The Power of the Dog
 Sian Heder – CODA
 Quiara Alegría Hudes – In the Heights
 Steven Levenson – tick, tick... BOOM!
 David Lowery – The Green Knight

Best Original Screenplay
Adam McKay – Don't Look Up
 Pedro Almodóvar – Parallel Mothers
 Paul Thomas Anderson – Licorice Pizza
 Wes Anderson – The French Dispatch
 Jeymes Samuel and Boaz Yakin – The Harder They Fall

Best Documentary
Flee (TIE) 
Summer of Soul (...Or, When the Revolution Could Not Be Televised) (TIE)
 Roadrunner: A Film About Anthony Bourdain
 The Sparks Brothers
 Street Gang: How We Got to Sesame Street

Best Animated Film
The Mitchells vs. the Machines
 Belle
 Cryptozoo
 Encanto
 Flee
 Luca

Best Use of Music
Last Night in Soho
 Cyrano
 In the Heights
 tick, tick... BOOM!
 West Side Story

References

External links
 

 
American film critics associations
Cinema of Michigan
Mass media in Detroit
Clubs and societies in Michigan
Organizations based in Detroit
Organizations established in 2007
2007 establishments in Michigan